Socket G1, also known as rPGA 988A, is a CPU socket introduced by Intel in 2009 for the mobile variants of the first-generation Intel Core processors. It is the successor to Socket P, and the mobile counterpart to LGA 1156 and LGA 1366.

History 
The first CPUs for the Socket G1 platform were released on September 23, 2009, in the form of the i7-720QM, 820QM, and 920XM. These CPUs use the Clarksfield core, which maintained the same 45 nm manufacturing process as the desktop Nehalem architecture. On January 4, 2010, the range was expanded with Core i3, i5, and i7 processors using the 32 nm Arrandale core and based on the Westmere architecture. On March 28, 2010, low-end Arrandale-based CPUs were released as the Pentium P6x00 series and Celeron P4x00 series. Further Clarksfield-based processors were released as the i7-740QM, 840QM, and 940XM on June 21, 2010. All Socket G1 processors have the Intel HD Graphics Ironlake core packaged onto the CPU substrate.

Supported processors 

 Intel Core i7 Dual-Core
 i7-620M, i7-640M
 Intel Core i7 Quad-Core
 i7-720QM, i7-740QM, i7-820QM, i7-840QM, i7-920XM, i7-940XM
 Intel Core i5 Dual-Core
 i5-430M, i5-450M, i5-460M, i5-480M, i5-520M, i5-540M, i5-560M, i5-580M
 Intel Core i3 Dual-Core
 i3-330M, i3-350M, i3-370M, i3-380M, i3-390M
 Intel Pentium
 P6000, P6100, P6200, P6300
 Intel Celeron
 P4500, P4600

Technical specifications
 Pins arranged in a 36 × 35 grid array
 18 × 15 size grid removed from the center
 Utilization of cam actuated retention mechanism
 The r in rPGA refers to "Reduced pitch" which is 1mm × 1mm in this socket design.
 Socket G1 systems can only run in dual-channel memory mode, compared to the triple-channel mode of LGA 1366, as a result of the lower pin count.

See also
 List of Intel processors
 Socket M
 Socket G2
 Socket P

References

External links
 http://www.molex.com/molex/products/family?key=rpga_989988_notebook_pc_cpu_sockets&channel=products&chanName=family&pageTitle=Introduction
 http://www.designworldonline.com/articles/5444/154/Molex-Sockets-Earn-Intel--Validation.aspx
 PGA988 Sockets at Intel.com

Intel CPU sockets